The Tanjong Pagar Dock Company, (1864–1905), the forerunner of today's Maritime & Port Authority, was founded by Guthrie and Company and Tan Kim Ching. The company was expropriated by the Government in 1905 who replaced it with the Tanjong Pagar Dock Board.

History  
The nutmeg plantations at Tanjong Pagar gradually transformed into a harbor due to the availability of deep water for steamer traffic as well as the growing congestion in the Singapore River  Many wharves and docks were built and several dock companies were founded but none was as successful as the Tanjong Pagar Dock Company (renamed Singapore Harbor Board in 1913, and eventually renamed as Port of Singapore Authority in 1964)

The Tanjong Pagar Dock Company grew and eventually became the largest docking and wharfing company in four decades; it even has their own Police Force and Fire Brigade. The dock's police force, Tanjong Pagar Dock Police, housed at the Tanjong Pagar Dock Police Station at the junction of then Goodwin Road and Entrance Road comprises mostly Sikhs from Punjab, the heart of India's Sikh community. Many of these Sikhs eventually settled down to form the Sikh community in Singapore today.

Sikhs  

The Sikh policemen were deployed at the Tanjong Pagar Police Station as well as the Tanjong Pagar Dock Police Station. The Sikhs responsibility was to counter Chinese Secret Societies as well as the security of the docks, harbors and the godowns. However, not all Sikhs that arrived are recruited as policemen as the British had stringent requirements – recruit has to be younger than 25 years old, have a minimum height of 5 feet 6 inch (1.68m) and a minimum chest measurement of 33 inch (84 cm). On top of that, it was also revealed in the General Orders that only non-English educated Sikhs who came from the farming community (known as Jhat Sikhs) are to be recruited. This is to ensure that the British will be able to control these Sikhs, as they were considered obedient and will follow blindly to those who they have taken the oath of obedience to. Hence, those who failed to be selected found work as security guards and watchmen.

The Sikhs were highly admired by the British, especially after encountering how the Sikhs fought during the war against British in Punjab, also known as the First Anglo-Sikh War, which happened from 11 December 1845 to 9 March 1846. This Sikhs were known as martial Indians, known for their bravery and their well-built body. The uprising of rebellious Singapore Societies along with the local police not deemed fit by the British lead to the recruitment of the Sikhs. This led to the eventual establishment of the Sikh Police Contingent in Singapore in 1881, with the first batch of 54 Sikh recruits arriving in Singapore on 26 March 1881 and another 65 in August that year  This marked the start of the Sikh community in Singapore as prior to this, the Sikhs that were sent here were convicts as Singapore served as a convict colony, and did not form a community. However, this stopped in 1857 when Andaman Island became the new convict colony, since then, up till the formation of the Sikh Police Contingent, there were no records of Sikh migrants in Singapore.

References

Transport operators of Singapore